Meirav Ben-Ari (born 13 November 1975) is an Israeli politician. She currently serves as a member of the Knesset for Yesh Atid and was previously a member of the Knesset for Kulanu between 2015 and 2019.

Biography
Ben-Ari was born in Raanana and moved to Netanya with her family as a child. Her father, Rafael Ben-Ari (originally Ayubi) was an Iranian-Jewish immigrant to Israel and her mother, Esther Ben-Ari (née Sa'adon) was a native-born Israeli of Libyan-Jewish origin. During her Israel Defense Forces national service she served in the Education and Youth Corps, with her last post being the education officer of the Golani Brigade. She studied for a BA in law and government and a Master's degree in business administration at the Interdisciplinary Center Herzliya. Between 2003 and 2004 she was head of the student union at the college.

In 2005 she took place in the reality show "Needed: A Leader". She won the contest, winning five million shekels. In the 2013 local elections she was fourth on the Rov HaIr list for Tel Aviv City Council. She was elected to the council and given the portfolio for promoting youth.

Prior to the 2015 elections she joined the new Kulanu party, and was placed tenth on its list. She was elected to the Knesset as the party won ten seats. She was placed sixth on the party's list for the April 2019 elections, but lost her seat when the party was reduced to four seats. In 2021 Ben-Ari joined Yesh Atid and was placed seventh on its list for the March 2021 elections. She re-entered the Knesset when the party won seventeen seats.

She currently lives in Tel Aviv. She has a daughter and is the first single mother in the Knesset.

References

External links

1975 births
Living people
21st-century Israeli women politicians
Reichman University alumni
Israeli Jews
Israeli people of Iranian-Jewish descent
Israeli people of Libyan-Jewish descent
Jewish Israeli politicians
Kulanu politicians
Members of the 20th Knesset (2015–2019)
Members of the 24th Knesset (2021–2022)
Members of the 25th Knesset (2022–)
People from Netanya
People from Ra'anana
Reality show winners
Women members of the Knesset
Yesh Atid politicians